

Events

February events
 February 9 - Budd unveils its first SPV-2000 self-propelled railcar in Philadelphia, Pennsylvania.
 February 22 - The Waverly tank car explosion was an explosion that occurred in Waverly, Tennessee, following a train derailment incident days earlier. The explosion killed 16.

March events
 March 1
 Australian National takes over Tasmanian Government Railways and freight and non-metropolitan operations of South Australian Railways.
 Amtrak opens Midway station in Saint Paul, Minnesota and closes the Minneapolis Great Northern Depot. The Twin Cities Hiawatha and Arrowhead trains are combined into the North Star.
 The M-K TE70-4S makes its first revenue run, handling a Southern Pacific Seattle–Los Angeles trailer-on-flatcar (TOFC) train between Portland and Los Angeles.
 March 31 – A  extension of the Tokyo Metro Chiyoda Line to  station is opened.
 March - Pacific Fruit Express dissolves its fleet of refrigerator cars, which is distributed between Southern Pacific and Union Pacific.

July events
 July 6 - A plastic bag of dirty linen carelessly placed against the electric heater in the vestibule of a British Rail sleeping car traveling between Penzance and London Paddington, England causes the Taunton train fire.

September events
 September 12 - The longest tunnel in New Zealand (8,896m), the Kaimai Tunnel on the East Coast Main Trunk opened.

October events 
 October 29 - Via Rail assumes all passenger train operations of Canadian National and Canadian Pacific in Canada.
 October 31 - The last passenger train departs from St Louis Union Terminal.

November events
 November 7 - The Illinois Railway Museum celebrates its 25th anniversary.
 November 18 - The Merivale Bridge is opened connecting South Brisbane and Roma Street and unifying the Brisbane suburban network. Originally designed to carry both narrow gauge and standard gauge tracks, the latter was not added until 1986.

December events 
 December 3 - The Southern Crescent passenger train derails at Shipman, Virginia, killing 6, injuring 60.
 December 4 - Union Pacific and Chicago & North Western jointly announce an agreement to build into Wyoming's Powder River Basin to access the numerous coal mines in the area.
 December 31 - The Chicago, Rock Island & Pacific Railroad operates its last passenger trains, the Peorian and a Chicago to Rock Island train.

Unknown date events
 The Stone Arch Bridge built by the Great Northern Railway across the Mississippi River in Minneapolis, Minnesota sees its final use as a railroad bridge; the bridge is later converted for pedestrian and bicycle use.
 The Itel Corporation purchases the Green Bay & Western.

Accidents

Deaths

May deaths 
 May - Harold W. Burtness, president Chicago Great Western Railway 1946–1948, dies (b. 1879).

July deaths
 July 22 - André Chapelon, French steam locomotive designer (b. 1892).

References 
 Rivanna Chapter, National Railway Historical Society (2005), This month in railroad history - October. Retrieved October 31, 2005.